Filipe Daniel Santos Neves (born 8 May 2001) is a Portuguese professional footballer who plays for Fabril Barreiro as a goalkeeper.

Football career
He made his professional debut for Mafra on 4 April 2021 in the Liga Portugal 2.

References

External links

2001 births
Footballers from Lisbon
Living people
Portuguese footballers
Association football goalkeepers
C.D. Mafra players
G.D. Fabril players
Campeonato de Portugal (league) players
Liga Portugal 2 players